SC 430, SC430, or SC-430 may refer to:

Konig SC 430 aircraft engine
Lexus SC 430 automobile
Santa Catarina SC-430, a highway in Brazil
South Carolina Highway 430, a highway in the United States